Teranodes is a genus of Australian funnel-web spiders that was first described by Robert John Raven in 1985.  it contains only two species: T. montanus and T. otwayensis. It was originally given the name "Terania", but it was later changed to "Teranodes" when it was discovered that the name was already in use for a genus of beetles.

References

Hexathelidae
Mygalomorphae genera
Spiders of Australia